Aethes dentifera is a species of moth of the family Tortricidae. It was described by Razowski in 1967. It is endemic to Peru.

References

dentifera
Moths described in 1967
Moths of South America
Taxa named by Józef Razowski